Prunus griffithii is a species of bush cherry native to Afghanistan and northern Pakistan.

References 

griffithii
griffithii